Borgofranco d'Ivrea is a comune (municipality) in the Metropolitan City of Turin in the Italian region Piedmont, about  north of Turin.

Borgofranco d'Ivrea borders the following municipalities: Settimo Vittone, Andrate, Nomaglio, Brosso, Quassolo, Chiaverano, Montalto Dora, and Lessolo.

References

External links
 Official website

Canavese